This is a list of sports clubs that were created or altered out of inspiration from a visiting team or from a member of the club requesting a change of first name or strip because they were inspired by another club through their performances or conduct.

See also

Generic
 Phoenix club (sports)
 Relocation of professional sports teams

Specific
 List of Croatian soccer clubs in Australia
 List of Greek Soccer clubs in Australia
 List of Italian Soccer clubs in Australia
 List of Serbian soccer clubs in Australia

References

 Clubs
Sports culture
Inspired